The Roads Not Taken is a 2020 drama film written and directed by Sally Potter. The film stars Javier Bardem, Elle Fanning, Salma Hayek and Laura Linney.

The Roads Not Taken had its world premiere at the Berlin International Film Festival on February 26, 2020 and was released on March 13, 2020, by Bleecker Street.

Plot

New York City
Leo lies in bed, oblivious to the phone ringing and the doorbell buzzing. His daughter, Molly, soon arrives and asks him why he did not answer the phone or the door. Leo mutters to himself as his caretaker, Xenia, begins to vacuum. Due to his dementia, he struggles to stay focused on getting ready for his medical appointments.

Leo and Molly eventually make it out of the apartment and into a taxi. Heading to the dentist, he fails to comply with the dentist's instructions and urinates himself. After changing his clothes, Molly gets her father into another taxi only for Leo to get confused and stumble out the passenger door, hitting his head. The taxi driver calls an ambulance and Leo is taken to the emergency room. Molly's mother, Rita, arrives and chastises her ex-husband for his behavior. Molly argues with Rita and Leo's attending doctor while Leo fixates on his dead dog, Néstor.

Once discharged, Molly takes Leo to Costco, where he disappears as she takes an important phone call from her boss. Later, she finds a sobbing Leo tightly clutching a dog he believes is Néstor. A woman then calls security, accusing Leo of trying to steal her dog, she later makes racially charged insults towards him as he is tackled to the ground by security. The guards let Leo go after Molly explains his medical condition.

Molly takes Leo to the optometrist, where he again fails to follow instructions. Outside, Molly receives a call from her boss stating that her project has been given to someone else. She tells her father that she cannot go on pretending anymore. Later that night, Leo walks out of his apartment and roams the streets barefoot as Molly frantically searches for him. He is eventually rescued by two taxi drivers.

Mexico
Leo's wife, Dolores, pleads with him to get out of bed and get ready. In the kitchen, he finds her preparing a bag filled with arranged flowers before driving off in their truck. Leo chases after her. In the car, he bickers with Dolores over what road to take, leading him to exit the vehicle in a state of delirium. Dolores drives off, leaving Leo on the desert road. He hitchhikes his way into town on the back of a maize truck.

That night, Leo comes across a Day of the Dead celebration at the local cemetery. Dolores guides him to the grave of their deceased son, Néstor, where Leo breaks down and blames himself for his death. Dolores and Leo tearfully embrace, reflecting on their sadness and desire to have their son back.

Greece
Leo sits by the sea at a tavern run by his friend Mikael, and he meets and makes conversation with German tourist, Anni, who reminds him of his daughter back home. They discuss Leo's unfinished novel about a man who must choose between returning home, or continuing on his journey in exile. Throughout the day, a frenzied Leo seeks out her opinion on his work, much to the annoyance of Anni's friends. Asking Leo if he's truly comfortable with the idea that he gave up his family in order to write, which Leo cannot answer.

That night, Anni and her friends board a party cruise that Leo secretly follows with his rowboat into the open sea. The cruise leaves him behind and Leo tires himself out attempting to catch up. The next morning, a group of fishermen find Leo dead in his rowboat and search his body for identification.

New York City
Leo is delivered to Molly by the police, who takes him back to his apartment. He begins to recount the stories he believes are running parallel to his own life, including his marriage in Mexico as a young man and his unexpected death in Greece. Molly tells him he was once married to a woman named Dolores before he emigrated to the United States and that he had run off to Greece when Molly was born, but returned after realizing his mistake. Molly sits by his bed and promises to stay by his side; meanwhile, a parallel version of Molly packs her things and walks out of Leo's apartment.

Cast
 Javier Bardem as Leo
 Elle Fanning as Molly
 Salma Hayek as Dolores
 Laura Linney as Rita
 Branka Katić as Xenia
 Milena Tscharntke as Anni
 Dimitri Andreas as Mikael
 Gerard Cordero as Police Officer Amenta

Production
In December 2018, it was announced Javier Bardem, Elle Fanning, Salma Hayek, Laura Linney and Chris Rock had joined the cast of the film, with Sally Potter directing and writing the screenplay. Christopher Sheppard would serve as producer under his Adventure Pictures banner, while BBC Films, HanWay Films, British Film Institute, Ingenious Media, Chimney Pot, Sverige AB, Adventure Pictures and Film i Väst would also produce the film. Bleecker Street would serve as the main distributor for the film. Production began that same month. During post-production, Rock's scenes were entirely cut from the film.

The film is dedicated to Nic Potter, Sally's brother, who suffered from Pick's Disease, a type of dementia.

Release
In September 2019, it was announced Focus Features had acquired international distribution rights. It had its world premiere at the Berlin International Film Festival on February 26, 2020. It was released in the United States on March 13, 2020. However, due to the COVID-19 pandemic, Bleecker Street partnered with distributors to virtually stream the film on participating theater websites splitting the revenue beginning April 10, 2020.

Reception
The site's critical consensus reads: "The Roads Not Taken is the well-acted result of an undeniably singular vision – one which is ultimately frustratingly, fatally inert." On Metacritic, the film has a weighted average score of 42 out of 100, based on 19 critic reviews, indicating "mixed or average reviews".

Writing for RogerEbert.com, Tomris Laffly gave the film 2 out of 4 stars, writing that "[throughout] these meaty and competing narratives, Bardem believably slips in and out of his three characters with nuance. Yet somehow, Potter can’t seem to connect the dots between these evocative yet clumsily edited viewpoints."

References

External links
 

2020 films
2020 drama films
American drama films
British drama films
Swedish drama films
English-language Swedish films
BBC Film films
HanWay Films films
Bleecker Street films
Focus Features films
Films about father–daughter relationships
2020s English-language films
2020s American films
2020s British films